Fabian Raymond Picardo  (born 18 February 1972) is a Gibraltarian politician and barrister serving as Chief Minister of Gibraltar and Leader of the Gibraltar Socialist Labour Party since 2011. At the 2015 and 2019 Gibraltar general elections, Picardo was re-elected to two further four-year terms by the people of Gibraltar.

Picardo attended the University of Oxford, where he studied legal theory.

Early life and education 

Picardo was born on 18 February 1972 in Gibraltar and grew up in the Upper Town area. He has said that the area where he grew up "always made me think about the huge potential that the bay of Gibraltar could have as long as we were able to work together with our Spanish neighbours." His father was a clerical worker for the Ministry of Defence on Gibraltar, and his mother was a personal assistant to Joshua Hassan, the founder of Hassans law firm and a Chief Minister of Gibraltar. Picardo has said that "My parents instilled in me the simple principle of equality, that nobody is better than anybody else and that we shouldn’t look down on absolutely anyone because all of us are created equal." Picardo's grandmother was Spanish, although he has said that the Picardo line came to Gibraltar during the Napoleonic Wars and that he's "particularly proud of that part of [his] bloodline."

Picardo first entertained the idea of becoming a lawyer as the "result of a discussion with a teacher, who I was particularly keen to argue with, who told me that if I wanted to argue I should charge people for it and become a lawyer." When aged 14, he visited Hassans law firm to discuss the idea with the lawyers. From 1990 to 1993, Picardo studied jurisprudence at Oriel College, Oxford. His studies were supported by the grant system introduced by Joe Bossano's Gibraltar Socialist Labour Party government in 1988. Oriel College paid tribute to Picardo's election by flying the flag of Gibraltar, and Picardo has also spoken at Oriel Law Society since his election. Picardo then studied at the Inns of Court School of Gray's Inn and was called to the bar by Middle Temple in 1994.

Legal career 

In September 1994, Picardo joined Hassans, the largest law firm in Gibraltar, as an associate. He became a partner in 2000. He was appointed as a Queen's Counsel on 12 June 2014.

Political career 

Picardo was a co-founder of the Gibraltar National Party in 1991, the predecessor to the Liberal Party of Gibraltar. In 2003, he joined the Gibraltar Socialist Labour Party (GSLP) and was elected as a Member of Parliament (MP) for the GSLP in that year's general election.

Picardo has described what made him interested in politics as a lawyer in Gibraltar: "I started to wake up to politics and see what Hassan had done, and I started to understand what Joe Bossano was doing. I realised that if I had the ability to become a lawyer then I should use that ability also in the interests of Gibraltar. Gibraltar is a place where all of us have to pull our weight; we all have to do what we can and I wanted to do what I could in politics." Picardo became the leader of the Gibraltar Socialist Labour Party in 2011, taking over from Joe Bossano. He won the 2011 election, forming a coalition government with the Liberal Party.

Picardo said that the "crowning achievements" of his first term were two new schools, a university, a new bank, and a new 700-berth marina. He also appointed Gibraltar's first Minister for Equalities and passed the Civil Partnerships Act in 2014, ending legal discrimination against same-sex couples. In October 2015, he said that if Brexit took place, Gibraltar "would have to carefully reconsider what the economic prospects for Gibraltar are and how we would be positioned."

Personal life 

Picardo is married to Justine Olivero, who works for Hassans law firm, and they have two sons and one daughter, Sebastian, Oliver and Valentina.

References

External links 

 Gibraltar profile. Chief minister: Fabian Picardo at BBC News.
  Fabián Picardo, nuevo primer ministro de Gibraltar

|-

1972 births
Alumni of Oriel College, Oxford
Chief Ministers of Gibraltar
Gibraltar Socialist Labour Party politicians
Gibraltarian people of Italian descent
Gibraltarian Queen's Counsel
Living people
People of Ligurian descent
20th-century Gibraltarian lawyers
21st-century Gibraltarian lawyers